Revd Canon Thomas Wentworth Pym DSO (1885 – 1945) was a prominent Church of England clergyman, theologian, and a Fellow of Balliol College, Oxford.

Biography
The son of Rt Revd Walter Ruthven Pym, Bishop of Bombay, Thomas Wentworth Pym was born on 10 August 1885. He was educated at Bedford School, between 1895 and 1904, and at Trinity College, Cambridge, where he was appointed as Chaplain. He served during the First World War, between 1914 and 1918, as Assistant Chaplain-General to the Third Army. He was appointed as an Honorary Chaplain to King George V in 1922, as a Canon of Southwark Cathedral in 1925, as a Canon of Bristol Cathedral in 1929, and elected as Chaplain and Fellow in Theology at Balliol College, Oxford in 1932.

He was married to the classicist and educator Dora Pym. The grandfather of BBC journalist Hugh Pym and father of author Christopher Pym, Revd Canon Thomas Wentworth Pym was invested as a Companion of the Distinguished Service Order in 1917. He died on 20 July 1945, three days after his brother, Leslie Pym MP.

Publications
Papers from Picardy, 1917
Psychology and the Christian Life, 1921
Mark's Account of Jesus, 1921
More Psychology and the Christian Life, 1925
Spiritual Direction, 1928
The Place of Sex in Life, 1928
A Parson's Dilemmas, 1930
Sharing, 1933
Conduct, 1933
Our Personal Ministry, 1938
Sex and Sense, 1938

References

1885 births
1945 deaths
People educated at Bedford School
Alumni of Trinity College, Cambridge
Fellows of Balliol College, Oxford
20th-century English Anglican priests
World War I chaplains
British theologians
Companions of the Distinguished Service Order